Le livre des mille nuits et une nuit (English: The Book of One Thousand and One Nights) is a 12-volume French translation of One Thousand and One Nights by J. C. Mardrus. The volumes, 298×228 mm each, were published in 1926–1932 by the Paris publisher L’Edition d’Art H. Piazza. With Morocco leather covers, the book sides were decorated with a gilt-stamped panel with oriental design different for each volume. The volumes were also decorated with gilt fleurons, triple gilt fillet and blind-stamped filet on the inside, as well as red watered silk endleaves.

The volumes feature the illustrations of the French artist Léon Carré and the cover art by Mohammed Racim, with binding work by René Aussourd. Racim spent eight years designing the cover art for the volumes. The volumes also contain the illustrated titles of each tale in Arabic on separate pages, following their French titles. The print run consists of 2,500 numbered copies. Soviet and Russian scholar Isaak Filshtinsky, however, considered Mardrus' translation inferior to others due to presence of chunks of text, which Mardrus conceived himself to satisfy tastes of his time.

References

External links

Book series introduced in 1926
French-language works
One Thousand and One Nights
Translations into French
1920s books
1930s books